Corey Lamont Holliday (born January 31, 1971) is a former American football wide receiver who played for three seasons with the Pittsburgh Steelers. He played in Super Bowl XXX against the Dallas Cowboys and had two receptions for 19 yards. He played college football for the North Carolina Tar Heels football team.

References

1971 births
Living people
Players of American football from Richmond, Virginia
Pittsburgh Steelers players
American football wide receivers
North Carolina Tar Heels football players